The European Alliance of EU-critical Movements or TEAM is a cooperation between Eurosceptic or EU-critical associations in various countries of Europe, including both non-partisan associations and political parties.

The coordinator of TEAM is currently Jesper Morville from the Danish People's Movement against the EU.

Affiliates

Austria
EU Withdrawal Party (EU-Austrittspartei)  http://www.euaustrittspartei.at/
Neutral Free Austria (NFÖ)
Communist Party of Austria (observer)
Friedensbüro Wien (observer)
Liste der EU-Opposition

Czech Republic

Independent Group Faithful we Remain (observer)

Denmark

People's Movement against the EU
Ungdom mod EU
Demokratisk Fornyelse
Enhedslisten (observer)

Estonia

Liikumine Ei Euroopa Liidule

Finland

Vaihtoehto EU:lle
Naisten Vaihtoehto EU:lle
Independence Party (Finland)

France

Rassemblement pour l’Indépendance et la Souveraineté de la France
Les Alternatifs (observer)

Greece

The EAN Movement
Association of Social and Ecological Intervention (observer)

Iceland

Heimssýn

Ireland

National Platform
Peace and Neutrality Alliance
People's Movement

Latvia

Kustiba par Neatkaribu

Malta

The Campaign for National Independence

Netherlands

Free Europe (observer)

Norway

Nei til EU
Ungdom mot EU
Senterungdommen
Senterpartiet (observer)
Rød Valgallianse (observer)

Slovenia
Skupina Neutro (observer)

Spain

Una Altra Democràcia és Possible (observer)

Sweden

Miljöpartiet de Gröna
EU-kritiska Centernätverket
Folkrörelsen Nej till EU

Switzerland

Forum für direkte Demokratie
Young 4 FUN

United Kingdom

Campaign for an Independent Britain
Campaign Against Euro-Federalism
Clannasaor
The Bruges Group
United Kingdom Independence Party
Youth for a Free Europe
Labour Euro-Safeguards Campaign (observer)
Green Party of England and Wales (observer)
Democracy Movement (observer)
European Foundation (observer)

See also
 European Referendum Campaign

External links
The European Alliance of EU-critical Movements, official web site

Euroscepticism
Pan-European political parties